Good Form may refer to:

 Good Form (Once Upon a Time)
 "Good Form" (song), by Nicki Minaj

See also
 Form (exercise)